The Dirk Van Loon House – also known as the Rock House – is an historic residence located in Pella, Iowa, United States.  Van Loon was a native of the Netherlands who immigrated to Pella in 1856.  He bought this property from Dominie Scholte, the town's founder.  Van Loon built the single-story, coarsely dressed, native limestone structure, and the frame addition off the back as his family grew.  In 1875, he became a homesteader in Kansas.  The house was listed on the National Register of Historic Places in 1982.

References

Houses completed in 1857
Vernacular architecture in Iowa
Pella, Iowa
Houses in Marion County, Iowa
National Register of Historic Places in Marion County, Iowa
Houses on the National Register of Historic Places in Iowa
1857 establishments in Iowa